Bila Tserkva Together is a political party in Ukraine. Registered by the Ministry of Justice of Ukraine on January 14, 2008 as the Right Will of Ukraine, it became the 142nd political party registered in Ukraine. In May 2018, the party was renamed Bila Tserkva Together, and became a regional political organization active in the city of Bila Tserkva in Central Ukraine.

The party took part in the 2019 Ukrainian parliamentary election in one constituency where it won a parliamentary seat. In electoral district 90, located in Bila Tserkva, Mykola Babenko won his seat in parliament with 28.23% of the votes (runner up Yurii Nesterchuk of the Servant of the People party gained 16.01% of the votes).

Vasyl Khmelnytsky, a Ukrainian oligarch, provides much of the party's financial support.

See also 

 List of political parties in Ukraine

References

External links

2007 establishments in Ukraine
Bila Tserkva
Liberal parties in Ukraine
Political parties established in 2007
Political parties in Ukraine
Regionalist parties in Ukraine